James Jeffrey Bull is Johann Friedrich Miescher Regents Professor in Molecular Biology at the University of Texas at Austin. He is best known for his influential 1983 monograph, Evolution of Sex Determining Mechanisms.

In the early 1990s, he changed the focus of his work to experimental evolution and phylogenetics, and has since had considerable success in both fields.  His work in experimental evolution involves observing genetic and phenotypic changes in bacteria and bacteriophages, the viruses that attack bacteria.

In 2003 he was elected a member of the American Academy of Arts and Sciences.
In 2016 he was elected to the National Academy of Sciences.

Bibliography
Evolution of sex determining mechanisms. 1983. Menlo Park, California: The Benjamin/Cummings Publishing Company, Inc.

References

External links
Home page

21st-century American biologists
Evolutionary biologists
Phage workers
Year of birth missing (living people)
Living people
University of Texas at Austin people
Fellows of the American Academy of Arts and Sciences
Members of the United States National Academy of Sciences